Rutledge is a borough in Delaware County, Pennsylvania, United States. The population was 784 at the 2010 census, down from 860 at the 2000 census.

History 
Rutledge was founded in 1885 by a group of Philadelphia businessmen, and incorporated as a borough in 1887. A promotional brochure produced in 1897 described the community as follows:

"Located ten miles from Philadelphia, on the line of the Central Division of the Philadelphia, Wilmington and Baltimore Railroad, three minutes walk from Morton Station – it is reached in from 20 to 30 minutes by 21 trains daily… To the west lies the magnificent Swarthmore College, and to the southeast, three miles away, lies the Delaware River… its school is one of the finest in the county; its houses are neat and attractive, and their owners take great pride in their homes and the adornment of their grounds."

Since then, there have been a few name changes. The train line is SEPTA's Media/Wawa Line, which provides 26 trains on weekdays from Philadelphia to what is now called the Morton-Rutledge Station. But in many ways, this description still holds true today. The schools in the Wallingford-Swarthmore School District are still among the finest in the county, and the homes, many of them dating back to the late 19th century, are still kept with pride by their owners.

There is a long-standing legend that the borough was named after Ann Rutledge, a sweetheart of Abraham Lincoln. This erroneous story is perpetuated in the Keystone Marker that greets those approaching Rutledge from the south on Morton Avenue. The actual story, according to the founders' brochure, is that the town was named after a then-popular romantic novel written in the 1860s. However, the site of what is now Rutledge borough was once a section of land on the estate of Edward Rutledge, who served as Representative from South Carolina at the Constitutional Convention of July 4, 1776, in Philadelphia and was the youngest signer of the Declaration of Independence.

In 1958, George Raymond, the president of the NAACP Chester branch, purchased a house in Rutledge.  The day before he was to move in, a fire burned down the house.  After the fire, the township attempted to exercise eminent domain and claim Raymond's property as a site for a new town hall.  Raymond threatened legal action and the township backed down.  The house was rebuilt and Raymond took residence in the house in 1959.

Geography
Rutledge is located in eastern Delaware County at  (39.900812, -75.327404). It is nearly surrounded by Ridley Township, with the northernmost tip of the borough touching the borough of Morton. The unincorporated community of Folsom in Ridley Township borders Rutledge to the south.

Triangle Park, a children's park, is located in the borough, as is a fire department.

Demographics

As of Census 2010, the racial makeup of the borough was 91.7% White, 2.9% African American, 3.1% Asian, and 2.3% from two or more races. Hispanic or Latino of any race were 1.8% of the population .

As of the census of 2000, there were 860 people, 297 households, and 217 families residing in the borough. The population density was 6,410.8 people per square mile (2,554.2/km²). There were 305 housing units at an average density of 2,273.6 per square mile (905.9/km²). The racial makeup of the borough was 96.51% White, 1.63% African American, 0.12% Native American, 0.93% Asian, and 0.81% from two or more races. Hispanic or Latino of any race were 1.05% of the population.

There were 297 households, out of which 40.1% had children under the age of 18 living with them, 61.3% were married couples living together, 9.1% had a female householder with no husband present, and 26.6% were non-families. 22.2% of all households were made up of individuals, and 10.1% had someone living alone who was 65 years of age or older. The average household size was 2.87 and the average family size was 3.44.

In the borough the population was spread out, with 30.3% under the age of 18, 7.0% from 18 to 24, 27.6% from 25 to 44, 23.6% from 45 to 64, and 11.5% who were 65 years of age or older. The median age was 38 years. For every 100 females there were 96.3 males. For every 100 females age 18 and over, there were 87.2 males.

The median income for a household in the borough was $80,972, and the median income for a family was $90,333. Males had a median income of $46,500 versus $33,281 for females. The per capita income for the borough was $51,800. About 4.1% of families and 5.3% of the population were below the poverty line, including 2.7% of those under age 18 and 12.1% of those age 65 or over.

Education 
Rutledge used to have its own one-school school district which was located in the current borough building.  Rutledge currently lies within the Wallingford-Swarthmore School District. Public school-age children in the borough attend Swarthmore Rutledge Elementary School for grades K-5, Strath Haven Middle School for grades 6-8, and Strath Haven High School for grades 9-12.

Transportation

No numbered highways serve Rutledge directly. Main thoroughfares in the borough include Morton Avenue, which follows a southwest-to-northeast alignment along Rutledge's northwestern border, and Sylvan Avenue, which follows a northwest-to-southeast alignment through the heart of the borough.

References

External links

 Borough of Rutledge official website
 Rutledge Borough at DelawareCountyPA.com

Populated places established in 1885
Boroughs in Delaware County, Pennsylvania
1885 establishments in Pennsylvania